Mountains of Slovenia are part of the Alps and of the Dinarides.

Alps
The Alps in Slovenia can be divided into:

Julian Alps in the northwestern part of Slovenia. The highest peak is Mount Triglav - 2,864 metres (9,396 feet) above sea.
Karawanks- a massive ridge that forms a natural boundary between Slovenia and Austria. The highest peak is Mt. Stol - 2,236 m ((7,336 feet).
Kamnik–Savinja Alps lie to the south of Karawanks. The highest peak is Mt. Grintovec - 2,558 m (8,392 feet) above sea.

Dinarides
In the Inner Carniola, the highest peaks are Veliki Snežnik (part of the Snežnik plateau and the highest non-Alpine peak in Slovenia, and Suhi vrh, part of the Nanos plateau. They're both part of the Dinaric Alps, a mountain chain that spans towards the southeast. The highest peak is Snežnik.

Part of the Dinaric Alps are also the Gorjanci mountain range, and in the Slovenian Istria, Mt. Slavnik (1,028 m) and Mt. Vremščica (1,027 m).

List of peaks
Listed below are all the mountains in Slovenia with a peak elevation above .

Notable peaks below 2000m

References 

Mountains
Slovenia
Slovenia